The 2000–01 season saw Oxford United compete in the Football League Second Division where they finished in 24th position with 27 points and were relegated to the Third Division. It was also Oxford's final season at the Manor Ground before moving to the Kassam Stadium.

Season summary
Any hopes that this season might mark a turn-around after two seasons of struggle were dashed right out of the gate, with Denis Smith's second spell as manager being brought to an end in early October after the team could only win one and draw one of their first ten outings. Club veteran Mike Ford took charge for the next five matches, but could manage a return of only one point. At the end of the month, the club announced a new management structure headed up by director of football Joe Kinnear, with Dave Kemp installed as manager. 

Unfortunately, the change failed to result in any real improvement in results, and Kinnear departed shortly after the turn of the year to take over as manager of relegation rivals Luton Town. Ultimately, the team's terrible defensive record (they kept only three clean sheets all season, two of which were the result of goalless draws) meant that survival never looked realistically on the cards, and they finished in bottom place, with just twenty-seven points (half of what they would have needed to survive) to their name, and a hundred goals conceded. 

Though chairman Firoz Kassam had initially indicated that Kemp would be allowed to remain for the following season and attempt to rebuild the squad, fan protests and a dreadful 6–2 loss to fellow strugglers Bristol Rovers soon changed his mind, and Kemp was sacked with two games remaining; his last game in charge would ironically result in a 3–1 victory over second-bottom Swansea City. Ford stepped in as caretaker for the final two matches, before Kassam appointed Mark Wright as the manager to lead Oxford into their first fourth-tier campaign since 1965.

Final league table

Results
Oxford United's score comes first

Legend

Football League Second Division

FA Cup

Football League Cup

Football League Trophy

Squad statistics

References

External links
 Oxford United 2000–01 at Soccerbase.com (select relevant season from dropdown list)

Oxford United F.C. seasons
Oxford United